KNEX (106.1 MHz branded as "Hot 106.1 FM") is a Top 40 (CHR) FM radio station that serves the Laredo/Nuevo Laredo, Tamaulipas, Mexico border area. The station is owned by Grupo Multimedios, through licensee Leading Media Group Corp.

External links

Contemporary hit radio stations in the United States
NEX
Radio stations established in 1991
1991 establishments in Texas
Multimedios Radio